The Compiègne Wagon was the train carriage in which both the Armistice of 11 November 1918 and Armistice of 22 June 1940 were signed.

Before the 1918 signing in the Forest of Compiègne, the wagon served as the personal carriage of Ferdinand Foch and was later displayed in French museums. However, after the successful invasion of France, Adolf Hitler had the wagon moved back to the exact site of the 1918 signing for the 1940 signing due to its symbolic role. The wagon was later destroyed near the end of World War II, most likely by the SS.

History

The Compiègne Wagon was built in May 1914 in Saint-Denis as dining car No. 2419D. The wooden carriage with a steel frame was one among 22 roughly identical restaurant cars of the 2403–2424 series. A metal frame with tie rods for better rigidity was added with a varnished teak wood: a usual practice in the early 20th century. It was used throughout the First World War in that capacity for Compagnie Internationale des Wagons-Lits, the company best known for operating the Orient Express. In October 1918, after two years of being stored in Clichy in the northern part of Paris, the wagon was commandeered by the French Army and converted into the office and mobile headquarters of Ferdinand Foch, the Supreme Allied Commander, who began using it from 28 October 1918. The famous French warlord was promoted to Marshal as late as 7 August 1918, two months before getting his own train.

On 8 November 1918, Foch and representatives from the Allied Powers met representatives from the German Empire to discuss the terms of armistice in the then-called "Wagon of Compiègne". The agreement was signed in the carriage on 11 November, and was the final ceasefire which ended fighting in the First World War; the other Central Powers had already reached agreements with the Allied Powers to end hostilities.

The car was later returned to Compagnie Internationale des Wagons-Lits and briefly resumed service as a dining car. On 1 October 1919, it was donated to the Army Museum (Paris). The wagon was on display in the Musée's Cour des Invalides from 27 April 1921 to 8 April 1927.

At the request of the Mayor of Compiègne, and with the support of the American Arthur Henry Fleming, the car was restored at the workshops of Saint-Denis, which took half a year, and returned to Compiègne in late October 1927. It was housed in a specially created museum building as part of the "Glade of the Armistice" historic monument, with the car a few meters from the exact site of the signing ceremony. The official opening of the carriage shelter was set on 11 November 1927 to commemorate the ninth anniversary of the Armistice agreement, and the fifth year of the memorial.

During World War II, Hitler ordered that the wagon be dragged out of the shelter and moved to exactly the same location for the signing of the second "armistice at Compiègne", on 22 June 1940; this time with Germany victorious. The carriage was moved out of its protective building and returned to the signing-place, which was several metres away and had been marked out as part of the monument. Subsequently, the wagon was taken to Berlin and displayed from 5 July, first next to the Brandenburg gates, later on the 'Museum island'. In 1944 the wagon was sent to Thuringia, in central Germany. Then it moved to Ruhla and later Gotha Crawinkel, near a huge tunnel system.  There it was destroyed in March 1945 by the SS with fire and/or dynamite, in the face of the advancing U.S. Army. However, some SS veterans and civilian eyewitnesses claim that the wagon had been destroyed by air attack near Ohrdruf while still in Thuringia in April 1944. Even so, it is generally believed the wagon was destroyed in 1945 by the SS. Today people who come to the Crawinkel commune have a chance to visit the exact site, wherein in 1945 the famous carriage burned out with a small memorial sign.

Replica
Today's historical wagon is an exact copy of the original one. In 1950, French manufacturer Wagons-Lits, the company that ran the Orient Express, donated a car from the same series to the museum—2439D is identical to its ravaged twin, from its polished wooden finishes to its studded, leather-bound chairs. The 2439 D was among those 37 carriages created by two series in 1913–1914. This car had also been part of Foch's private train during the 1918 signing. The opening ceremony took place on 11 November 1950 and the car was renumbered No. 2419D. It is parked beside the display of the original car's remains: a few fragments of bronze decoration and two access ramps.

See also 

 Iron diplomacy

Notes

World War I memorials in France
Railway coaches of France
France in World War II
Treaty signing historic sites
Compiègne
Private railroad cars